Yiğitpınarı can refer to:

 Yiğitpınarı, İhsaniye
 Yiğitpınarı, Pasinler